The , abbreviated as , is one of the main operators of expressways and toll roads in Japan. It is headquartered in Nagoya, Aichi Prefecture.

The company was established on October 1, 2005 as a result of the privatization of Japan Highway Public Corporation. The company manages roadways mainly in the Tōkai and Hokuriku regions. Roadways in other regions of Japan are managed by East Nippon Expressway Company and West Nippon Expressway Company.

References

External links 
  - In Japanese
  - In English

Expressway companies of Japan
Companies based in Nagoya
Transport in Aichi Prefecture
Government-owned companies of Japan
Transport companies established in 2005
Japanese companies established in 2005